Fedor Žugić (born 18 September 2003) is a Montenegrin basketball player for ratiopharm Ulm of the German Basketball Bundesliga.

Professional career 
On February 22, 2019, Žugić made his professional debut for Budućnost in the EuroLeague against Žalgiris Kaunas. At 15 years and 157 days of age, he became the youngest player to ever play in the EuroLeague.

On July 2, 2021, he has signed with ratiopharm Ulm of the German Basketball Bundesliga. Previously declared, Žugić subsequently withdrawn his name from consideration for the 2022 NBA draft.

National team career 
In July 2022, Žugić was a member of the Montenegro under-20 team that won a bronze medal at the FIBA U20 European Championship in Podgorica, Montenegro. Over seven tournament games, he averaged 18 points, 3.1 rebounds, and 3 assists per game. He won a spot on the all-tournament team.

See also 
 List of youngest EuroLeague players

References

External links
 Profile at aba-liga.com
 Profile at realgm.com
 Profile at fiba.basketball
 Profile at euroleague.net

2003 births
Living people
KK Budućnost players
KK Studentski centar players
Montenegrin men's basketball players
Point guards
Ratiopharm Ulm players